Ralph Clarke may refer to:
 Ralph Clarke (British politician) (1892–1970), British Conservative Member of Parliament for East Grinstead 1936–1955
 Ralph Clarke (Australian politician) (born 1951), Australian Labor Party member of the South Australian House of Assembly 1993–2002
 Ralph Clarke (mayor) (died 1660), Mayor of Chesterfield 1598.

See also
Ralph Clark, British officer in the Royal Marines
Clarke (surname)